Gurpreet Kaur Bhatti (born Watford) is a British Sikh writer who has written extensively for stage, screen and radio. Her play Behzti (Dishonour) was cancelled by the Birmingham Rep after protests against the play by Sikhs turned violent and alleged death threats forced Bhatti to go into hiding.

Life
Bhatti's first play, Behsharam (Shameless), received criticism from the Sikh community when it opened in 2001.

In 2005, Behzti won the Susan Smith Blackburn Prize for the best English language play written by a woman.

In 2010, her follow-up to Behzti titled Behud (Beyond Belief) was co-produced by Soho Theatre and Coventry Belgrade and was shortlisted for the John Whiting Award.

In 2014, Khandan (Family) opened to sell-out audiences at the Birmingham Rep and the Royal Court Theatre.

In June 2014, her first anthology of plays, Plays One, was published by Oberon Books.

She is now working on a stage commission for the National Theatre. Bhatti also regularly writes for The Archers, the Radio 4 drama serial.

Awards
 2003 Nominated for the  Race in the Media Award by the Commission for Racial Equality in the radio music/entertainment category for North East South West. 
 Asian Women of Achievement awards, nominated twice
 2005 Susan Smith Blackburn Prize, a US-based award of $10,000 made annually to the best English language play by a woman, for Behzti.
 2010 Behud (Beyond Belief) nominated for the John Whiting Award

Works

Plays
  Soho Theatre, London 2001
 Behzti  The Door, Birmingham Rep, Birmingham, UK 2005
 Come to Where I'm From, Listen to the Podcast at Painesplough
  Soho Theatre, London 2010
 Londonee,  Mukul and Ghetto Tigers and Lifeguard Productions 
 Two Old Ladies, Leicester Haymarket 2000 
 Fourteen (2014),  Watford Palace Theatre commissioned 'Fourteen' after Gurpreet Kaur Bhatti wrote a short play for 'Come To Where I'm From' in 2010, co-produced by Watford Palace Theatre and Paines Plough
 Khandan (Family) (2014),   A Royal Court Theatre and Birmingham Repertory Theatre Co-production

Radio, films, teleplays
 Heart of Darkness (Feb 2013), Stone, BBC Radio 4
 The Archers (2012), BBC Radio 4
 Everywhere and Nowhere, feature film, 2011
 Dead Meat, half-hour film produced by Channel 4 as part of the Dogma TV season
 Stitched Up, Commissioned Series for BBC1
 Honour, single Film for BBC2
 The Cleaner, hour-long film for BBC1
 Lipstick and Nails, police drama for Great Meadow Productions
 Pound Shop Boys, originally commissioned by October Films/Film Council/Scottish Screen and developed through PAL 
 Airport 2000, Leicester Haymarket / Riverside Studios
 An Enemy of the People, 2010, hour-long episode for BBC World Service
 Fourteen Units a Week, 2010, From Fact to Fiction, BBC Radio 4
 Mera Des (My Country), BBC Radio 3
 My Lithuanian Lady, BBC World Service
 Westway, over thirty episodes – 1999-2001 – of the BBC World Service Radio Drama Series 
 Eastenders, BBC 1, nine episodes – 2001-04

References

External links
 

Year of birth missing (living people)
Living people
English screenwriters
British women screenwriters
English dramatists and playwrights
People from Watford
English people of Indian descent
Alumni of the University of Bristol
English Sikhs
Punjabi people